Mohammed Moquim (born 3 July 1965) is an Indian politician from INC. In May 2019, he was elected as the member of the Odisha Legislative Assembly from Barabati-Cuttack. He is married to Firdousia Bano and has 2 daughters- Sofia Firdous and Nayeema Tazeen.

Career
Moquim is from Lalbag, Cuttack district. His father's name is Mohammed Nayeem. He passed BE From Orissa Engineering College in 1990. He contested 2019 Odisha Legislative Assembly election from Barabati-Cuttack Vidhan Sabha and won the seat on 23 May 2019.

References

Odisha politicians
Living people
Members of the Odisha Legislative Assembly
Indian National Congress politicians
1965 births
Odisha MLAs 2019–2024
Indian National Congress politicians from Odisha